Delaware football may refer to:
Delaware Fightin' Blue Hens football, a college football team
Delaware Panthers, a semi-pro team from 1932–1933
Delaware State Hornets football, a college football team